Janet Moraa Bundi (born 15 December 1996) is a Kenyan footballer who plays as a forward for Vihiga Queens and the Kenya women's national team.

International career
Bundi played for Kenya at the 2016 Africa Women Cup of Nations.

See also
List of Kenya women's international footballers

References

1996 births
Living people
Footballers from Nairobi
Kenyan women's footballers
Women's association football forwards
Kenya women's international footballers